Hypodoxa involuta is a moth of the family Geometridae. It was first described by Louis Beethoven Prout in 1933 and is found on Buru in Indonesia.

References

Pseudoterpnini
Taxa named by Louis Beethoven Prout
Moths described in 1933